Academy Street Historic District is a national historic district located at Madison, Rockingham County, North Carolina. It encompasses 12 contributing buildings in the town of Madison.  It was developed from the mid-19th to mid-20th century, and includes notable examples of a variety of popular architectural styles.  Notable buildings include the Twitchell-Gallaway House (1824), Foy-McAnally House (c. 1840, 1852), Cardwell-Black House (c. 1860), Churchill House, Martin House (c. 1870), Madison United Methodist Church (early 1900s), Pratt-Van Noppen House, and Wakeham (1921).

It was listed on the National Register of Historic Places in 1982.

References

Historic districts on the National Register of Historic Places in North Carolina
Buildings and structures in Rockingham County, North Carolina
National Register of Historic Places in Rockingham County, North Carolina